El Oro Municipality may refer to:

 El Oro Municipality, Mexico State, a municipality in the State of Mexico, Mexico
 El Oro Municipality, Durango, a municipality in Durango, Mexico

Municipality name disambiguation pages